Milan Rakić (Serbian Cyrillic: Милан Ракић; 18 September 1876 – 30 June 1938) was a Serbian poet-diplomat and academic.

He focused on dodecasyllable and hendecasyllable verse, which allowed him to achieve beautiful rhythm and rhyme in his poems. He was quite a perfectionist and therefore only published three collections of poems (1903, 1912, 1924). He wrote largely about death and non-existence, keeping the tone sceptical and ironic. Some of his most well-known poems are An Honest Song (Iskrena pesma), A Desperate Song (Očajna pesma), Jefimija, Simonida and At Gazi-Mestan (Na Gazi-Mestanu). He was a member of the Serbian Royal Academy (1934).

Biography

Early life
Rakić was born on 18 September 1876 in Belgrade to father Mita and mother Ana (née Milićević). His father, educated abroad, was Serbia's Minister of Finance (1888) and his mother was the daughter of Serbian writer Milan Milićević.

He finished elementary school (grade school) and high school (gymnasium) in Belgrade. He completed law school in Paris. It was in Paris that he, like Jovan Dučić, came under the influence of French Symbolist poets. They both had learned to admire French culture and had dreamed of a better world after the war. After returning to Belgrade from Paris he became a diplomat (also like Dučić) for the Serbian (and later Yugoslav) government and remained in that job until nearly his death, representing the country abroad.

Personal life
His sister Ljubica was married to Milan Grol; and his wife Milica was the daughter of Ljubomir Kovačević, a distinguished Serbian historian and politician.

Death
He died prematurely in 1938 in Zagreb after a surgical operation. He is interred in the Belgrade New Cemetery.

Works
 Collection of Poems, 1903
 Collection of Poems, 1912
 Collection of Poems, 1924

References

Sources
 Jovan Skerlić, Istorija nove srpske književnosti (Belgrade, 1914 and 1921), pp. 458–60.

External links

 
 Article on Serbian Poetry
 Translated works by Milan Rakić
 

1876 births
1938 deaths
Writers from Belgrade
20th-century Serbian people
Serbian male poets
Diplomats from Belgrade
People from the Principality of Serbia
People of the Kingdom of Yugoslavia
Burials at Belgrade New Cemetery